Amalberga Vos (d. after 1573) was the Abbess of the Ter Hage Abbey in Zeeland from 1534 until 1572.

Her family and background is unknown, but she became a member of the convent in 1529, and abbess five years later. She played an important political part: she had contacts within the government, expanded the abbey and its importance considerably and made it into an asylum (1544) where a great deal of religious dissidents were given protection, as well as being a religious and charitable center. During the great Iconoclasm of 1566, the Calvinist Caspar van der Heyden held a speech outside the convent gates the 24 August, after which the abbey was attacked. The nuns themselves were not molested but given save passage, but the abbey was given such damage that it could not be restored for a year. Because of the threat of war in 1567, Amalberga Vos evacuated the nuns to Gent. She was replaced as abbess by Louise Hanssens in 1573, but it is not known if she simply left the office or if she died.

References 
 Kees Kuiken, Vos, Amalberga, in: Digitaal Vrouwenlexicon van Nederland. URL: http://resources.huygens.knaw.nl/vrouwenlexicon/lemmata/data/VosAmalberga [13/01/2014]

Year of birth unknown
Year of death unknown
Nuns of the Habsburg Netherlands
Roman Catholic abbesses
People of the Protestant Reformation